Bill Copeland (8 December 1928 – 2017) was a Canadian sailor who competed in the 1952 Summer Olympics.

References

1928 births
2017 deaths
Canadian male sailors (sport)
Olympic sailors of Canada
Sailors at the 1952 Summer Olympics – 6 Metre